WRFE (89.3 MHz) is a non-commercial, listener-supported  FM radio station in Chesterfield, South Carolina.  It broadcasts a Southern Gospel radio format, on a network known as "Joy FM."  WRFE is owned by Positive Alternative Radio, Inc. and features programming from Salem Radio Network.

References

External links
 
 

Southern Gospel radio stations in the United States
Chesterfield County, South Carolina
Radio stations established in 1975
RFE